Micheldever Spoil Heaps is a  biological Site of Special Scientific Interest in Micheldever in Hampshire.

This site is composed of spoil heaps from nineteenth-century railway construction, and it is described by Natural England as "of quite exceptional botanical importance". Most species have colonised the site from nearby, but some from a distance, and the plant assemblage is in a state of flux, with many rareties. There are large populations of fly orchids.

The site is open to the public.

References

Sites of Special Scientific Interest in Hampshire